Griffin Newman (born February 19, 1989) is an American actor and comedian. He is known for starring as Arthur Everest in the Amazon Studios television series The Tick, as the voice of Orko in the Netflix animated series Masters of the Universe: Revelation, cohosting the film podcast Blank Check with Griffin & David alongside critic David Sims, and for acting as cohost and sidekick Watto on The George Lucas Talk Show.

Early life
Newman is the son of film producer Peter Newman and casting director Antonia Dauphin. His maternal grandfather, Claude Dauphin, was a French actor. His younger brother, James Newman, is also an actor. Newman was raised in Greenwich Village, and attended Saint Ann's School.  He was interested in performing from an early age, often performing Fozzie Bear routines for friends and family. He started stand-up comedy at the age of ten as part of the 'Kidsncomedy' program run by Jo Ann Grossman. His material was mostly political, workshopped with his father. He began getting some attention from agents at this time, though his parents were reluctant for him to pursue a career in acting. His first onscreen appearance was as 'Teenage Fan' in the mockumentary The Buried Secret of M. Night Shyamalan. His role was mostly cut for the film. As a teenager, Newman regularly attended Buck's Rock Performing and Creative Arts Camp.

Newman started college in 2007 at California Institute of the Arts with the intention of becoming a filmmaker. He dropped out after seven months in order to pursue a career in comedy and acting.

Career
Newman's first major onscreen appearance is in the film The Treatment in 2006 as high school student Scott. He went on to play roles in a number of shorts and student films. He also began performing stand-up regularly around this time and produced a one-man show titled Grifftopia, which he performed in 2009 and 2010.

In 2010, Newman appeared in the teen film Beware the Gonzo in the role of Horny Rob Becker, one of the friends of the titular Gonzo (Ezra Miller). Though the film was released to mixed reviews, Newman's performance was positively reviewed, with Odie Henderson from RogerEbert.com writing that "Becker is the most interesting character in the film."

Over the next few years, Newman guest starred in a number of television shows, including Blue Bloods, Big Lake, and Law & Order: Special Victims Unit, as well as appearing in sketches for Funny or Die.  He played the role of Russ in the television mini-series Political Animals for the USA Network, and was listed by Just for Laughs as one of the 2012 New Faces of Comedy: Characters.

In 2013, Newman was cast in John Mulaney's sitcom Mulaney for NBC as Seymour. The network passed on the show after shooting the pilot, but later in the year, it was picked up by Fox with the role of Seymour cut from the script. Newman has described the situation as his own version of the Dark Phoenix saga.

Later that year, Newman became a correspondent for Nikki & Sara Live, and began making regular appearances on The Chris Gethard Show. Alongside Riley Soloner, he hosted the podcast Talking TCGS from 2013 to 2014. He hosted The Awooga Comedy Hour with Andrew Tavin from January 2013, a live comedy show that became weekly from May 2014.

In 2014, Newman appeared in the film Draft Day as Rick the Intern alongside Kevin Costner, and later that year announced he had become a part of a Maude Team at UCB. He went on to have supporting roles in other feature films including Fort Tilden, Free The Nipple, and Naomi and Ely's No Kiss List.

Newman has appeared in a number of webseries, including Snarky Sidekick and The Untitled Web Series That Morgan Evans Is Doing for MTV; he starred as the Director in Colin Quinn's webseries Cop Show for all three seasons.

With critic David Sims, Newman started The Phantom Podcast in March 2015, a podcast dedicated to analysing the film The Phantom Menace as though it was the only film in the Star Wars franchise. The show went on to discuss the other Star Wars films before being retitled Blank Check with Griffin & David and establishing its new premise. The podcast involves Sims, Newman, and sometimes a guest, discussing filmographies of directors who have had massive success early on in their career which has enabled them to be given free rein to make large scale passion projects. The podcast has received praise from critics.

In 2016 Newman had a supporting role in the HBO series Vinyl, and guest starred in the sitcoms Search Party and Difficult People. Later that year, it was announced Newman would be playing Arthur Everest in Amazon Video's new reboot of The Tick alongside Peter Serafinowicz in the titular role. The pilot, directed by Wally Pfister, was released on August 18, 2016. The show was picked up for a first season in September 2016.  The first six episodes of the first season were released on August 25, 2017. The remaining six episodes of the first season were released on February 23, 2018. On January 17, 2018, Amazon ordered a second season of 10 episodes, which premiered in 2019. Newman has received critical acclaim for his portrayal of Everest. In May 2019, Amazon Studios announced that the show would not return for a third season.

Newman has a small role in Woody Allen's film A Rainy Day in New York, previously set for release in 2018. In October 2017, Newman made a statement via his Twitter expressing his regret at taking the role in the film, due to the allegations of sexual abuse against Allen. He announced he would be donating his salary from the film to RAINN.

Premiering in February 2018, Showtime's animated series Our Cartoon President features Newman as the voice of Jared Kushner.

Newman regularly appears as part of Connor Ratliff's The George Lucas Talk Show at UCB, as Watto. After the UCB theater closed down due to the COVID-19 pandemic, Ratliff, Newman and their UCB producer Patrick Cotnoir started doing weekly regular episodes and charity marathon livestream versions of the show on the streaming network PlanetScum.live . The charity livestreams have raised over $100,000 for various charities while marathoning through TV shows like Arli$$, Big Lake and Studio 60 on the Sunset Strip.

In February 2020, Newman was announced as the voice of Orko in the Netflix series Masters of the Universe: Revelation after campaigning online for the role when the show was first announced.

Filmography

Film

Television

References

External links
 Blank Check with Griffin and David
 
 
 

1989 births
21st-century American comedians
21st-century American male actors
American male comedians
American male film actors
American male television actors
American people of French descent
American podcasters
Comedians from New York City
Jewish American male actors
Living people
Male actors from New York City
People from Greenwich Village
Saint Ann's School (Brooklyn) alumni
21st-century American Jews